Flaine is a ski area in the Haute Savoie region of the French Alps, and is a part of the linked Grand Massif domain. It is in the territory of the communes of Magland and Arâches-la-Frasse. Flaine is linked to Samoëns, Morillon, Les Carroz and Sixt-Fer-à-Cheval, with 267 km of pistes in total. It featured the first 8-seater high speed chairlift, Les Grands Vans, and the first snow cannons to be installed in Europe. Flaine is often called the "big snowy bowl" due to it having one of the best snow records in the Alps. It is a modern, car-free resort with a wealth of amenities, all in close proximity to the accommodation.

History

An encounter between Man, Mountain and Art

The site was discovered in 1959 by the geophysicist Éric Boissonnas and the Swiss architect Gérard Chervaz, who went on to succeed in their bid to create a fine example of urban development, architecture and design, where short-term profitability would be second to aesthetics and care of the environment.

Éric and Sylvie Boissonnas entrusted Flaine’s design to Marcel Breuer (1902–1981), the eminent Bauhaus architect whose structural designs are well-known around the world. These include The "Palais de l'Unesco" in Paris, the Whitney Museum, The Atlanta-Fulton Central Branch Library, Flushing Meadows Sports Park in New York City, and the Bijenkorf in Rotterdam. Breuer is also known for his innovative use of materials (i.e. tubular steel) in creating his iconic furniture designs.  With one of his signature pieces being the Wassily Chair.

Functionality and integration

Right from the design stage, Éric Boissonnas and Marcel Breuer were careful not to disturb the natural surroundings and integrate the resort into the receiving mountain. In other words, the general layout blends in with the environment's contours, and the different levels which make up the resort can not be seen from one to the other. The result is a feeling of privacy and tranquillity.

The master plan; the ski runs designed by champion Émile Allais; the technical network for electric cables; gondola lift stations on the same level as the ski runs; even the colour of concrete reminiscent of the surrounding rocks:- everything was inspired by the ambition to find a balance between functionality and integration.

Construction

The construction of the resort was not without difficulty. Chappis and Pradelle left after Breuer joined the team, Boissonnas fell out with the government official in charge of planning France's winter sports industry and when local landowners found out that Boissonnas was a billionaire they threatened to block the building of the access road to the resort until they received adequate compensation. The result was a three-year delay and huge cost overruns, and led to greater state involvement in French ski resort development. By the time the resort was opened on 17 January 1969 it had probably cost Boissonnas the equivalent of around $250 million from his personal fortune at 2005 prices.

The site is divided into two areas which are joined by two free lifts. The upper area, Flaine Forêt, at an altitude of 1700 m, consists of a number of apartment buildings named after constellations, the Éric et Sylvie Boissonnas Auditorium, shops, offices and restaurants. The lower area, Flaine Forum, at an altitude of 1600 m, has more restaurants, shops, bars and accommodation.

The resort boasts a wealth of monumental works of art - "La Tête de Femme" by Pablo Picasso, "Le Boqueteau" by Jean Dubuffet,  and "Les Trois Hexagones" by Victor Vasarely.

New developments

Hameau de Flaine is just outside the main resort and in between this and Flaine is "Flaine Montsoleil", a new development which has the same 'ski-in, ski-out' feel as the main resort but constructed in a more traditional alpine style.

More apartments like Montsoleil are going in just above the Hameau next to the golf course. Opened in 2011, it has been called "Le Refuge de Golf" (The Golf Refuge).

Location

Flaine is about 1 hour and 15 minutes away from Geneva Airport, approximately 3 hours drive from Lyon, and 30 km from the A 40 motorway (l'Autoroute Blanche). It is close to resorts Les Houches, Les Contamines, large ski area Chamonix-Mont-Blanc as well as the Portes du Soleil region — notably resorts Les Gets and Morzine. Trips to Italy via the Mont Blanc Tunnel to Courmayeur are also possible.

Bus services are available several times a day to Taninges in the Giffre Valley (where resorts Morillon and Samoëns are situated) where buses to Geneva and Chamonix can be accessed. The bus service is run by Transdev Alpbus.

Skiing

Ski terrain

There is skiing for most in Flaine, as the resort enjoys a particular reputation as being all rounded.

The most notable runs in Flaine include Styx (Black); le Diamant Noir (black); Serpentine (blue/red); Fred (red); Tourmaline (blue) and Méphisto (blue/red).

In Les Carroz, Morillon, and Samoëns classic runs include Marvel; a fabulously long green that goes through the forest, Sairon; a long blue with many jumps and banks on the side of the piste, Lou Darbes; a medium length blue run that is downhill all the way — an excellent run for 'bombing' down, and Aigle Noir, a steep, difficult black run.

The predominantly north-facing runs are very reliable: package companies offering "snow guarantees" often import punters from other French resorts when their pistes have lost the amount of sufficient snow that can be skied on. Flaine was the first resort to feature artificial snow making in Europe from 1973.

In each different grade of run (green, blue, red, & black) there is a theme in the Flaine bowl. For example most of the blue runs are named after metals/jewels (e.g. Serpentine, Turquoise, Dolomie, Cristal, Tourmaline, Émeraude), nearly all the reds are diabolically named (e.g. Faust, Méphisto, Belzébuth, Lucifer) and most black runs after stones (e.g. Diamant Noir, Agate, Styx). Most green runs are named after trees (e.g. Mélèze, Pin, Epicea). This only occurs in the Flaine valley though; the other resorts' runs are named separately. However the same names are repeated in different resorts. For example "Combe", valley, is a popular name because of the many runs leading into valleys. Arête, ridge, is also popular.

In Flaine Forum, the Nursery Slopes are served by a small chairlift (Le Pré) which is excellent for beginners due to the fact that it doesn't go far above the snow. They are also interesting as they go down from the resort centre, rather than down to the resort. There is also a short green run which runs to the left of the lift.

Lift system

There are 2 free lifts (Pré and Télébenne) which link the up and lower parts of Flaine. Flaine is in the process of implementing an upgrade program to its lifts and trails called Flaine Perspectives 2006–2010. For 2006, new gondola cabins were installed on Aup de Véran, whilst the base station was renovated for 2007. For 2008, the Les Gerats lift was installed to allow better access to the new Intrawest village (Flaine Montsoleil). In addition the Tête des Verds 6-person detachable chair was installed from the main base area. For 2009, Flaine aim to renovate the Télébenne, installation of a 4-person chair to replace the Bois button, to be called Aujon and the installation of a 4-person chair to link the western part of the Intrawest village.

Other activities

Music in Flaine
Académie Internationale de Musique (Flaine International Music Academy) is held every August. Its aim is to teach music to a high level and to hold free concerts in the Eric et Sylvie Boissonnas Auditorium a 500-seater auditorium. ‘Musique in Flaine’ came about when a number of music teachers involved with the Bain de Musique wanted to set up a high level academy devoted to chamber music.

Walking
Flaine is a centre for summer walking. A walker can either take the GR96 or take a lift to the Les Grandes Patières (2480 m) which gives access to the Désert de Platé a fine and extensive limestone pavement (known in French as a "lapiaz"). From there visitors can walk to the Refuge de Platé which is fully open from mid-June to mid-September. The route takes the walker past deep ravines, rocks and fissures which contain moss campion, gentians and other flowers. 
In the other direction, also on GR96, walkers can go past the Lac de Flaine, climb to the Col de Cou, down to the Col de la Frête (1347 m) and then to the tiny hamlet of La Colonnaz from here there is a relatively flat broad track to Les Carroz. The whole route should take about 3½ hours.
Other walks that can be taken are to the Belvédère d’Anjon where views over the valley can be had.

Golf
The Golf course is open between July and September. It is positioned at the Col de Pierre Carrée at an altitude of 1900 metres, making it one of the highest golf courses in Europe. The course is spread over 3500m of available green, and also has a driving range, putting green and training area. There is also a restaurant with a small sun deck and simple menu combining local produce.

Evolution and environmental issues 

Flaine is situated on a geological plate of rock called the "Désert de Platé".  This type of rock formation is extremely rugged and cracked looking. It is no surprise therefore that there an unusually large number of crevasses and potholes in the area, which are particularly visible in summer. Due to most of them being covered by thin layers of snow, they are not visible in the winter. This makes skiing off piste in the Flaine area fairly dangerous.

Night life

The most popular bar for British holiday-makers in Flaine is "le White Pub" — known as "the White Grouse" before being bought out by a pair of French entrepreneurs in 2004. Le White Pub shows sporting events but these tend to be more of a Winter Sports style. The bar is mainly used by attracting package tour groups on 'benders'.

Also in the area is the "Perdrix Noire" i.e. Black Grouse. This pub attracts a mixed crowd of French and British.

The bowling alley bar has late opening hours until 2AM.

Crime

The crime associated with larger resorts was notable by its absence in Flaine until the turn of the 21st century. A few years ago there had been increasing reports of burglaries, muggings and minor assaults.  Nowadays crime has seemed to have declined because of Flaine promoting itself as a more 'family resort'.

References

External links

 Flaine Website
 Flaine - The Shock of the New

Ski areas in France
Tourism in Auvergne-Rhône-Alpes
Marcel Breuer buildings
Tourist attractions in Haute-Savoie
Sports venues in Haute-Savoie